Jonathan Cape FRS (1793 – 9 September 1868) was a mathematician and Church of England clergyman.

Life
Cape was born in 1793 in Uldale, Cumberland (now Cumbria), the eldest son of the Rev. Joseph Cape (d. 1830). He was admitted to Trinity College, Cambridge, in 1812 as a sizar, graduating with a BA in 1816 (5th Wrangler) and MA in 1821. He was ordained deacon in 1816 by the Bishop of Salisbury (acting for the Bishop of Winchester), and priest by the Bishop of Salisbury in 1818.

He was appointed Assistant Professor at the Royal Naval Academy, Portsmouth (a post which he held with the curacy of St George's, Portsea) in 1816, before being appointed in 1822 Senior Professor of Mathematics at Addiscombe College, Croydon, Surrey. He held this post until the closure of the College in 1861. Vibart's detailed history of Addiscombe contains anecdotal material about Cape, commenting that he was "the most remarkable member of the staff of the College during the whole course of its existence ... He was Addiscombe ... from its commencement until its end 40 years later".

Cape was noted for his dry, sarcastic wit, and for his strong Northumbrian accent, as well as being "an excellent teacher and disciplinarian, with a keen sense of humour". He was appointed Fellow of the Royal Society in 1852 for his mathematical publications. He retired on a very substantial pension, and died – a convivial bachelor – at Croydon on 9 September 1868 aged 75, leaving £12,000.

Notes and references

Publications 
Mathematical tables ... (Croydon,1838; 3rd edition London, 1860).   
A course of mathematics principally designed for the use of students in the East India Company's seminary at Addiscombe. (London, 1850). 2 volumes.

References 

 Boase, F., 1892/1965: Modern English Biography, volume 1, p 539 
 Venn, J.A., 1940/2001: Alumni Cantabrigiensis. Part Two, volume 1, p 507
 Vibart, H.M., 1894: Addiscombe, its heroes and men of note

1793 births
1868 deaths
English mathematicians
People from Cumberland
Burials in Surrey
Fellows of the Royal Society
Alumni of Trinity College, Cambridge
19th-century English Anglican priests